Balvard Rural District is a rural district (dehestan) in the Central District of Sirjan County, Kerman Province, Iran. At the 2006 census, its population was 4,927, in 1,127 families. The rural district has 31 villages.

References 

Rural Districts of Kerman Province
Sirjan County